The Lompoc Unified School District is located in the City of Lompoc, California and operates schools in and around the city, servicing Lompoc, Mission Hills, Vandenberg Village, and Vandenberg Air Force Base.

The school district's Superintendent is Trevor McDonald.

Schools
<small>===Elementary schools===
Buena Vista Elementary School 
Clarence Ruth Elementary School 
Crestview Elementary School 
Leonora Fillmore Elementary School 
 Arthur Hapgood Elementary School 
La Cañada Elementary School 
La Honda Elementary School 
Los Berros Elementary School 
Miguelito Elementary School 

[Lompoc Unified school district]

Middle schools
Lompoc Valley Middle School 
Vandenberg Middle School

High schools
Cabrillo High School 
Lompoc High School 
Maple High School

Home School Programs
Mission Valley

Adult education
Adult education program

References

External links
 

School districts in Santa Barbara County, California